Shannon LaBrie is an American singer, songwriter, guitarist, and pianist from Lincoln, Nebraska, United States, residing in Nashville, Tennessee, since 2008.

Career
LaBrie has released three studio albums, Just Be Honest (2013) and War & Peace (2016) and her latest album Building released by Moraine Records (2020). The latter album's first single "Firewalker" which was written with Tia Sillers and Joe Robinson, was listed as NPR's "Top 20 Songs of 2020", and the album was listed by NPR's Anne Powers as "Top Fall Albums to Listen Too." LaBrie, also wrote "She Got Soul", a track on Robert Randolph and The Family Band's Grammy Nominated album Got Soul (2017), and "Just Do It", a track on Lily & Madeleine's album Canterbury Girls (2019). LaBrie, also co-wrote "I Got Your Love (You Got Mine)" with Gabe Dixon, which was recorded by Gabe Dixon and Susan Tedeschi of The Tedeschi Trucks Band and released in 2021.

Discography

Albums
 Just Be Honest (2013)
 War & Peace (2016)
 Building (2020)

EPs
 Songs from the Smoakstack (2015)
 My Snow Angel (2015)
 Forevermore (2017)
 Home from Anywhere (2019)

Singles
 "Calls Me Home" (2010)
 "I Remember a Boy" (2012)
 "Alcohol (Acoustic Version)" (2015)
 "It's Political" (2016)
 "Crazy Enough" (2016)
 "Stubborn Heart" (2017)
 "All by Myself (Acoustic Cover)" (2019)
 "I Hope You Dance" (2019)
 "Firewalker" (2020)

Music videos

References

External links
 
Heavy Rotation: Public Radio's Favorite Songs Of 2020 (So Far) : World Cafe : NPR

Living people
American women country singers
American country singer-songwriters
American women guitarists
American women pianists
Americana musicians
Country musicians from Nebraska
Year of birth missing (living people)
21st-century American women
Singer-songwriters from Nebraska